The 2020 Maia Challenger was a professional tennis tournament played on clay courts. It was the second edition of the tournament which was part of the 2020 ATP Challenger Tour. It took place in Maia, Portugal from 30 November to 6 December 2020.

Singles main-draw entrants

Seeds

 1 Rankings are as of 23 November 2020.

Other entrants
The following players received wildcards into the singles main draw:
  Nuno Borges
  Gastão Elias
  Gonçalo Oliveira

The following player received entry into the singles main draw as an alternate:
  Geoffrey Blancaneaux

The following players received entry from the qualifying draw:
  Duje Ajduković
  Altuğ Çelikbilek
  Maxime Hamou
  Michael Vrbenský

Champions

Singles

  Pedro Sousa def.  Carlos Taberner 6–0, 5–7, 6–2.

Doubles

  Zdeněk Kolář /  Andrea Vavassori def.  Lloyd Glasspool /  Harri Heliövaara 6–3, 6–4.

References

2020 ATP Challenger Tour
November 2020 sports events in Portugal
December 2020 sports events in Portugal
2020 in Portuguese tennis